Sir Thomas Duncombe Love Jones-Parry, 1st Baronet (5 January 1832 – 18 December 1891) was a Welsh landowner and Liberal politician. He was one of the founders of the Y Wladfa settlement in Patagonia, South America.

Love Jones-Parry inherited the Madryn estate from his father, Sir Love Jones-Parry. He was educated at Rugby School and Christ Church, Oxford, later becoming a high sheriff in 1854. He was a prominent figure in eisteddfodic circles, where he had the bardic name "Elphin".

Jones-Parry rose to prominence in politics when he won the Caernarvonshire seat in the 1868 election, defeating the Tory candidate, George Douglas-Pennant (later Lord Penrhyn). The five year old David Lloyd George carried the Liberal banner at the head of the victory parade in Llanystumdwy. He lost this seat at the next election, but won the Caernarvon Boroughs seat at a by-election in 1882 and held it until 1886. He was made a baronet by Gladstone for his services to the Liberal Party.

Towards the end of 1862 Captain Love Jones-Parry, accompanied by Lewis Jones, left for Patagonia to decide whether it was a suitable area for Welsh emigrants. The trip was largely financed by Jones-Parry, who paid at least £750 from his own pocket. They first visited Buenos Aires where they held discussions with the Interior Minister Guillermo Rawson then, having come to an agreement, they headed south. They reached Patagonia in a small ship named the Candelaria, and were driven by a storm into a bay which they named "Porth Madryn" after Jones-Parry's estate in Wales. The town which grew near the spot where they landed is now named Puerto Madryn .

Following a favourable report from Jones-Parry and Lewis Jones, a group of 162 Welsh emigrants departed for Patagonia in the ship Mimosa in 1865. Later there was criticism that the report had given too favourable an impression of the area, though the criticism was directed at Lewis Jones rather than Love Jones-Parry.

References

Dictionary of Welsh Biography

External links 
 Project-Hiraeth – Documents the stories of the Welsh colony in Patagonia, Argentina through film, text and illustration.
 
Photograph of Love Jones-Parry, c.1865

1832 births
1891 deaths
People from Gwynedd
Jones-Parry, Thomas Duncombe Love, 1st Baronet
Liberal Party (UK) MPs for Welsh constituencies
UK MPs 1868–1874
UK MPs 1880–1885
UK MPs 1885–1886
High Sheriffs of Caernarvonshire
Welsh pioneer settlers in Patagonia
Members of Parliament for Caernarfon
People educated at Rugby School
Alumni of Christ Church, Oxford